VBites is a plant-based meat alternative and vegan cheese company that develops 140 products and retails in 24 countries worldwide. All its foods are manufactured in the UK at VBites' factory in Corby. The company was bought by Heather Mills in 2009.

The manufacturing company was founded in 1993 and mainly traded as the Redwood Wholefood Company before its name was changed to VBites in 2013 to match the restaurant she owned.

Brands include Cheezly - a selection of Cheese equivalents, since 2017 Domino's Pizza have been using it for their vegan options.

See also
 List of vegetarian restaurants

External links
 Official website

References

About VBites - https://www.vbites.com/about/

Food manufacturers of the United Kingdom
Vegan cuisine
Food and drink companies established in 1993
Food brands of the United Kingdom
Meat substitutes
Vegetarian companies and establishments of the United Kingdom
Cheese analogues
Imitation foods